Parakannemeyeria is an extinct genus of dicynodont. Fossils of the genus have been found in the Ermaying, Tongchuan and Kelamayi Formations of China.

Gallery 

Kannemeyeriiformes
Anisian genera
Triassic synapsids of Asia
Triassic China
Fossils of China
Fossil taxa described in 1960
Anomodont genera